The Free Dictionary is an American online dictionary and encyclopedia that aggregates information from various sources.

Content
The site cross-references the contents of The American Heritage Dictionary of the English Language, the Collins English Dictionary, the Columbia Encyclopedia, the Computer Desktop Encyclopedia, the Hutchinson Encyclopedia (subscription), and Wikipedia, as well as the Acronym Finder database, several financial dictionaries, legal dictionaries, and other content.

It has a feature that allows a user to preview an article while positioning the mouse cursor over a link. One can also double-click on any word to look it up in the dictionary.

Site operator
The site is run by Farlex, Inc., located in Huntingdon Valley, Pennsylvania.

Farlex also maintains a companion title, The Free Library, an online library of out-of-copyright classic books as well as a collection of periodicals of over four million articles dating back to 1984, and definition-of.com, a community dictionary of slang and other terms.

Wikipedia Mirror
Wikipedia content is hosted at the sub-domain encyclopedia.thefreedictionary.com, which is excluded from search-engine indexing in its entirety by Farlex with the use of meta tags. This is done to avoid duplicate content in the search-engine results and prevent user traffic that would otherwise go to Wikipedia.

The Free Library
The Free Library has a separate homepage. It is a free reference website that offers full-text versions of classic literary works by hundreds of authors. It is also a news aggregator, offering articles from a large collection of periodicals containing over four million articles dating back to 1984. Newly published articles are added to the site daily. The site comprises a selection of articles from open-access journals that can in many cases also be found on a journal's own website.

It is a sister site to The Free Dictionary and usage examples in the form of "references in classic literature" taken from the site's collection are used on The Free Dictionary's definition pages. In addition, double-clicking on a word in the site's collection of reference materials brings up the word's definition on The Free Dictionary.

See also
 List of online dictionaries
 List of online encyclopedias

References

External links
 
 The Free Dictionary - Dictionary, Encyclopedia, and Thesaurus
 Definition-Of - Community Dictionary
 Free Thesaurus - Synonyms, Antonyms, and Related Words
 The Free Library - Free News, Magazines, Newspapers, Journals, Reference Articles and Classic Books

American online encyclopedias
Companies based in Montgomery County, Pennsylvania
Multilingual websites
Online encyclopedias
Online English dictionaries
Websites which mirror Wikipedia
21st-century encyclopedias